Rajya Sabha elections were held in 1956, to elect members of the Rajya Sabha, Indian Parliament's upper chamber.

Elections
Elections were held in 1956 to elect members from various states.
The list is incomplete.

Members elected
The following members are elected in the elections held in 1956. They are members for the term 1956-62 and retire in year 1962, except in case of the resignation or death before the term.

State - Member - Party

Bye-elections
The following bye elections were held in the year 1956.

State - Member - Party

 Delhi - Begum Siddiqa Kidwai - INC ( ele 24/11/1956,  term till 1958 )
 Delhi - Onkar Nath - INC ( ele 24/11/1956 term till 1960 )
 Assam -  Mahendramohan Chaudhury - INC ( ele  01/12/1956 term till 1958 )
 Orissa - Govind Chandra Misra - INC ( ele 06/12/1956 term till 1960 )
 Bihar - Awadeshwar Prasad Sinha - INC (  ele  10/12/1956 term till 1958 )
 Bihar - Krishna Mohan Pyare Sinha- INC (  ele  10/12/1956 term till 1958 )
 Madras - Dawood Ali Mirza - INC ( ele 11/12/1956 term till 1962)
 Uttar Pradesh - Mahabir Prasad Bhargava - INC ( ele 13/12/1956 term 1958 )
 Uttar Pradesh - Bal Krishna Sharma - INC ( ele 13/12/1956 term 1962 death 29/04/1960 )
 Uttar Pradesh - Pandit Algu Rai Shastri - INC ( ele 13/12/1956 term 1962 res. 24/04/1958 )
 West Bengal - Surendra Mohan Ghose - INC ( ele 13/12/1956 term till 1962 )
 West Bengal - Mehr Chand Khanna - INC ( ele 15/12/1956 res 26/02/1962 3LS )

References

1956 elections in India
1956